Gossip in the Grain is the singer-songwriter Ray LaMontagne's third album, released on October 14, 2008. It was produced by Ethan Johns and recorded in Box, England. Along with his band members, LaMontagne is also joined by the singer-songwriter Leona Naess on "A Falling Through" and "I Still Care for You". As commented on LaMontagne's website, the new album "proves to be his most creative and emotionally expansive collection to date". Up to May 9, 2009, the album had sold 238,435 copies in the US.

Track listing

During the week of November 1, 2008, Gossip in the Grain debuted at No. 3 on the Billboard 200.

"Let It Be Me" was used on the seventh episode of the first season of the television show, Fringe, the second episode of the second season of Eli Stone, the second episode of the sixth season of Criminal Minds and the first season finale of Parenthood. "Winter Birds" was used on the tenth episode of the fifth season of ABC's Grey's Anatomy. "I Still Care For You" was used on the twelfth episode of the fifth season of House and "Painless". "Sarah" was used on the fourth episode of the sixth season of Instant Karma.

"You Are the Best Thing" was used in the film I Love You, Man and in an episode of the Australian TV show Packed to the Rafters.

Personnel
 Ray LaMontagne – songwriting, vocals, acoustic guitar, electric guitar (6), harmonica (8)
 Ethan Johns – producer, drums (1, 2, 4, 6, 8, 9), bass (1, 3, 6), electric guitar (1), piano (2), B-3 (2), string arrangement (2, 3, 10), ukulele (3), percussion (3), Wurlitzer (6), Mellotron (6, 10), backing vocals (6, 7), banjo (7)
 Jennifer Condos – bass guitar (2, 4, 7, 8, 9), drums (7), backing vocals (7)
 Eric Heywood – guitar (2, 8), pedal steel (4, 9), acoustic guitar (7), backing vocals (7)
 Leona Naess – backing vocals (4, 9, 10)
 Dominic Monks – synthesizer (4)

Charts

Certifications

References

External links
 
 Billboard review of Gossip in the Grain

2008 albums
Ray LaMontagne albums
Albums produced by Ethan Johns